John George IV (18 October 1668 in Dresden – 27 April 1694 in Dresden) was Elector of Saxony from 1691 to 1694.

He belonged to the Albertine line of the House of Wettin and was the eldest son of the Elector John George III and Anna Sophie of Denmark.

First years as elector
John George succeeded his father as Elector when he died, on 12 September 1691.

At the beginning of his reign his chief adviser was Hans Adam von Schöning, who counselled a union between Saxony and Brandenburg and a more independent attitude towards the emperor. In accordance with this advice certain proposals were put before Leopold I to which he refused to agree; and consequently the Saxon troops withdrew from the imperial army, a proceeding which led the chagrined emperor to seize and imprison Schöning in July 1692. Although John George was unable to procure his minister's release, Leopold managed to allay the elector's anger, and early in 1693 the Saxon soldiers rejoined the imperialists.

Marriage and The Neidschutz Affair
In Leipzig on 17 April 1692, John George married Eleonore Erdmuthe of Saxe-Eisenach, Dowager Margravine of Brandenburg-Ansbach. The young Elector was forced to marry by his mother, the Dowager Electress Anna Sophie, supposedly to produce legitimate heirs to the Electorate. The real reason for the marriage was to end the liaison between John George and Magdalena Sibylla of Neidschutz.

John George III, the late Elector had tried to separate the lovers, perhaps because he was aware of a close blood relationship between them — for Magdalena Sybilla may have been his own illegitimate daughter by Ursula Margarethe of Haugwitz, and therefore John George IV's half-sister. By order of the Elector, Ursula had married Colonel Rudolf of Neidschutz, who officially appears as the father of her daughter.

John George may never have known of his possible blood relationship to Magdalena Sibylla or regarded the claim as a rumor spread by ill-wishers. Immediately after he assumed the Electorate, he openly lived with her, and she became the first ever Official Mistress (Favoritin) of an Elector of Saxony.

The Electress, Eleonore Erdmuthe, humiliated every day since her wedding, was relegated to the Hofe (the official residence of the Elector). John George moved into another palace with Magdalena Sybilla.

Desperate to marry his mistress, John George tried to murder his wife, but was prevented by his younger brother, Frederick August. When John George tried to stab Eleonore with a sword, the unarmed Frederick stopped the weapon with his hand, injuring it and leaving him with a lifelong handicap.

Last Days
After a substantial bribe from the Elector, on 20 February 1693 Magdalene Sybille was created Countess of Rochlitz (Grafïn von Rochlitz) by Imperial Decree. Shortly before, she gave birth the only daughter of the couple, Wilhelmina Maria.

But the happiness ended soon: Magdalene Sybille contracted smallpox and died on 4 April 1694, in the arms of the Elector, who was also infected with the disease.

John George died twenty-three days later, on 27 April. He was buried in the Freiberg Cathedral.

Because he died without legitimate issue—Electress Eleonore suffered two miscarriages during their marriage, in August 1692 and February 1693—he was succeeded as Elector by his brother Frederick Augustus I (king of Poland as Augustus II of Poland). The new Elector took the guardianship of the little orphan Wilhelmina Maria, who was raised in the court. He acknowledged the girl as his niece and gave her a dowry when she was married to a Polish Count.

Literature 
 Karlheinz Blaschke: Johann Georg IV.. In: Neue Deutsche Biographie (NDB). Band 10, Duncker & Humblot, Berlin 1974, S. 527 f. (Digitalisat).
 Heinrich Theodor Flathe: Johann Georg IV. In: Allgemeine Deutsche Biographie (ADB). Band 14, Duncker & Humblot, Leipzig 1881, S. 384–386.
 Jürgen Helfricht: Die Wettiner - Sachsens Könige, Herzöge, Kurfürsten und Markgrafen, Sachsenbuch Leipzig 4. aktualisierte Auflage 2007 
 Frank-Lothar Kroll: Die Herrscher Sachsens: Markgrafen, Kurfürsten, Könige 1089–1918, Verlag C. H. Beck, München 2007, S. 160 ff. (Digitalisat)
 Wolfgang Sommer: Die lutherischen Hofprediger in Dresden, Frank Steiner Verlag Stuttgart 2006, S. 236 (Digitalisat)
 Franz Otto Stichart: Das Königreich Sachsen und seine Fürsten, Leipzig 1854, S. 221 ff.(Digitalisat)
 Hans-Joachim Böttcher: Johann Georg IV. von Sachsen & Magdalena Sibylla von Neitschütz - Eine tödliche Liaison, Dresden 2014,

Ancestry

External links
John George IV in the Mad Monarchs Series: http://www.madmonarchs.nl/

References

Prince-electors of Saxony
Garter Knights appointed by William III
1668 births
1694 deaths
Burials at Freiberg Cathedral
House of Wettin
Nobility from Dresden
Deaths from smallpox
Electoral Princes of Saxony
Albertine branch